The Townsville Stadium (previously Townsville RSL Stadium) is a multi-purpose indoor venue located at the Murray Sporting Complex in Annandale, Queensland. The facility features an international standard wooden sports floor, multi-purpose function rooms, a public gym, stadium administration and the Townsville City Council.

The Stadium, which opened in 2011, is owned and operated by the City of Townsville, has a total spectator capacity of 2,500 (1,700 seated) and is the home court of the Townsville Fire (WNBL). From the 2014–15 NBL season, the Townsville Crocodiles moved out of their long time home, the Townsville Entertainment Centre, and into the RSL Stadium.

The largest attendance at the venue was recorded on 27 July 2011 for a women's international basketball game when the Australian Opals played China in front of 2,200 fans.

The Stadium can also host other sports such as netball, volleyball and badminton, and can also be used for indoor events such as expos, conventions, conferences or dinners.

References

External links

2011 establishments in Australia
Defunct National Basketball League (Australia) venues
Townsville Crocodiles
Townsville Fire
Multi-purpose stadiums in Australia
Sports venues in Townsville
Sports venues completed in 2011
Netball venues in Queensland
Basketball venues in Australia